The Pendragon Legend (Hungarian: A Pendragon-legenda) is a 1934 novel by the Hungarian writer Antal Szerb.

The book is a philosophical thriller/comedy/murder-mystery/ghost story set first in London and then in Wales. A mystical element is diffused through an increasingly complex plot, as all threads converge in the final chapters.

The Pendragon Legend was first translated into English by Lili Halápy in 1963, and again by Len Rix in 2006.

Film adaptation

In 1974, the novel was turned into a film The Pendragon Legend directed by György Révész.

Historical References
The novel contains many references to English and European mysticism:
 Rosicrucians
 Robert Fludd
 Count of St. Germain
 Paracelsus
 Philosopher's Stone
 Great Work

External links
PushkinPress.com English editions of works by the author Antal Szerb
Independent review of The Pendragon Legend
Interview with the translator in the Hungarian Literature Online

Hungarian novels
1934 novels
Novels set in London
Novels set in Wales